Four Stars is a 2006 French comedy film directed by Christian Vincent.

Cast 
 Isabelle Carré - Franssou
 José García - Stéphane
 François Cluzet - René
 Michel Vuillermoz - Marc
 Jean-Paul Bonnaire - Jacky Morestel
 Mar Sodupe - Christina
 Guilaine Londez - Marianne

References

External links 

2006 comedy films
2006 films
French comedy films
2000s French films